Jadwiga Katarzyna Emilewicz (born 27 August 1974) is a Polish politician and political scientist. In 2020, she was Deputy Prime Minister of Poland. In 2019, she became Minister of Development, upon her three-year service as an undersecretary of state in the Ministry of Development, and from 2018 to 2019, she was Minister of Entrepreneurship and Technology in the government of Mateusz Morawiecki.

Biography
Emilewicz was born in Kraków in 1974 to Antoni and Zdzisława Szyler.

In 2002, together with Artur Wołek, she published "Reformers and Politicians: The Power Play for the 1998 Reform of Public Administration in Poland, as Seen by Its Main Players".

On 27 November 2015, Emilewicz was appointed undersecretary of state in the Ministry of Development and held the function until 2018, when she became the head of the Ministry of Entrepreneurship and Technology in the government of Mateusz Morawiecki. Emilewicz retained the office during its reorganization into Ministry of Development upon the following election in 2019 and thus entered Morawiecki's second cabinet. Meantime, in 2017, she was one of the founders of the Agreement, a party whose one of the Vice Leaders she shortly became.

In 2020, Emilewicz was sworn in as Deputy Prime Minister of Poland, simultaneously maintaining her so-far ministerial office, following Jarosław Gowin stepping down as Deputy Prime Minister and her candidature being proposed by Gowin's Agreement party instead.

Publications
 Reformers and politicians. The game for political reform in 1998 seen through the eyes of its actors, Nowy Sącz 2002 (together with Artur Wołek).
 European Eastern Policy. Challenge of Poles and Germans, Krakow 2008 (editor of collective work).
 College of Diplomacy, "New Europe" 2007, No. 1 (5).
 Citizenship Lesson, "Znak" 2003, No. 579.

References

1974 births
Living people
Politicians from Kraków
Polish political scientists
Women political scientists
Government ministers of Poland
Jagiellonian University alumni
Women government ministers of Poland
Women members of the Sejm of the Republic of Poland
Members of the Polish Sejm 2019–2023
21st-century Polish women politicians